USS Niphon was a steam operated vessel acquired by the Union Navy during the American Civil War. She was used by the Navy to patrol navigable waterways of the Confederacy to prevent the South from trading with other countries.

Niphon, a wooden and iron screw steamer launched at Boston, Massachusetts, in February 1863, delivered to the Navy at Boston on 22 April 1863; and commissioned at Boston Navy Yard on 24 April 1863, Acting Ensign Joseph B. Breck in command; and was formally purchased 9 May 1863.

Assigned to the North Atlantic Blockade 
 
Assigned to the North Atlantic Blockading Squadron, Niphon was first stationed off Fort Fisher, North Carolina, which protected Wilmington, North Carolina, from attack by sea. She captured the blockade runner Banshee at New Inlet, North Carolina on 29 July 1863. On 18 August she chased the steamer Hebe, carrying drugs, clothing, coffee, and provisions for the Confederacy, and forced the blockade runner aground north of Fort Fisher where she was abandoned. The boats from Niphon were sent to destroy Hebe, but were swamped in heavy seas and their crews captured. Then  opened fire on Hebe and she was burned to the waterline.

Niphon captures the large blockade runner Ella and Annie 
 
With , Niphon captured the steamer Cornubia north of New Inlet on 8 November. Cornubia’s papers exposed the whole scheme by which the Confederacy had clandestinely obtained ships in England. The next day Niphon captured the blockade runner Ella and Annie off Masonboro Inlet, North Carolina, attempting to slip in with a cargo of arms and provisions. Trying to escape, the runner rammed Niphon but surrendered to Federal bluejackets who boarded her when the ships had swung broadside.
 
After capturing Ella and Annie, Niphon returned to Boston for repairs, but was back off New Inlet on 6 February 1864. On 21 April, Niphon, and  destroyed the salt works at Masonboro Sound, North Carolina. On 27 August, Niphon and  ventured up Masonboro Inlet to silence a Confederate battery. Landing parties from the ships captured arms, ammunition, and food stuffs. A boat expedition from Niphon landed at Masonboro Inlet on 19 September to gain intelligence on the defenses of Wilmington, North Carolina. They learned that raider  and several blockade runners were at Wilmington. That day Acting Master Edmund Kemble relieved Breck in command.

Attacking blockade runners 
 
 
Late on the night of 29 September, Niphon fired upon Night Hawk as she attempted to run into New Inlet, and observed her go aground. A boat crew led by Acting Ensign Semon boarded the steamer and, under fire from Fort Fisher, set her ablaze and brought off the crew as prisoners.

Mrs. Rose O’Neal Greenhow drowns with a bag of gold around her neck 
 
Niphon ran the British blockade runner Condor aground off New Inlet on 1 October, but was prevented from destroying the steamer by intense fire from Fort Fisher. Among the passengers on board Condor was one of the most famous Confederate agents of the war, Mrs. Rose O'Neal Greenhow who, fearful of being captured with her important dispatches, set out in a boat for shore. Her craft overturned in the heavy surf. The crew managed to get ashore; but the lady, weighted down by $2,000 in Confederate gold in a pouch around her neck, drowned.

Niphon, under fire, saves a stranded Berberry 
 
On the 7th, the Union blockader  chased the blockade runner Annie ashore at New Inlet, under the guns of Fort Fisher, but the 285-ton Federal wooden steamer ran aground herself and was destroyed to prevent capture. Niphon rescued Aster’s crew under a hail of fire from Confederate batteries and towed out , after the Northern steamer had become disabled trying to pull Aster off the shoal.
 
On the last day of October,  and Niphon seized another blockade runner named Annie off New Inlet, North Carolina. She was a British steamer with cargo of tobacco, cotton, and turpentine.

End-of-war decommissioning and sale 
 
Late in November Niphon, in need of extensive repairs, steamed to Boston where she was decommissioned on 1 December. She was sold at public auction there on 17 April 1865, and was documented as Tejuca on 23 October 1865 and was sold abroad in 1867.

References  

Ships of the Union Navy
Ships built in Boston
Steamships of the United States Navy
Gunboats of the United States Navy
American Civil War patrol vessels of the United States
1863 ships